Novi Slankamen is a village in Serbia. It is located in the municipality of Inđija, Syrmia District, Autonomous Province of Vojvodina. Novi Slankamen is situated about 15 kilometers east of Inđija, on the bank of Danube (Dunav) and has a total population of 3,421 (2002 census).

Name

In Serbian and Croatian the village is known as Novi Slankamen (Нови Сланкамен) and in Hungarian as Újszalánkemén.

Its name means "New Slankamen", while the name of the neighbouring village, Stari Slankamen, means "Old Slankamen". The name "Slankamen" itself means "the salty stone".

Geography

Latitude: 45.1253, 
Longitude: 20.2394, 
Altitude - feet 459 Lat (DMS)	45° 7' 31N	Long (DMS) 20° 14' 22E	Altitude (meters)	139
Time zone (est)	UTC+1(+2DT)
Approximate population for 7 km radius from this point: 10,059

Ethnic groups

The population of the village consists of Serbs (79.73%), Croats (15.74%), Romani, Hungarians, Slovaks, and Germans.

History

Before the early 1990s and the migrations caused by the Yugoslav Wars, the population of Novi Slankamen consisted of Croats (66%), Serbs (31%), and other groups.

During the Yugoslav Wars, most Croats left Novi Slankamen and other settlements in the Serbian part of Syrmia. They moved to Croatia, Western Europe, North America, and Australia, while Serb refugees from Croatia, Bosnia and Herzegovina, and Kosovo settled in said places.

Historical population

1961: 4,372
1971: 4,005
1981: 3,210
1991: 2,977

Economy

The local economy is based primarily on cultivation of orchards and vineyards.

See also
List of places in Serbia
List of cities, towns and villages in Vojvodina

References
Slobodan Ćurčić, Broj stanovnika Vojvodine, Novi Sad, 1996.

External links 

 Official page
 Novi Slankamen

Populated places in Syrmia